Ralph English Miller Jr. (September 23, 1933 – November 21, 2021) was an American alpine ski racer. At age 22, he competed in three events at the 1956 Winter Olympics in Cortina d'Ampezzo, Italy, when he was one of the top downhill racers in the world. During those Olympics, he was on the cover of Sports Illustrated; he was the third racer on the downhill very icy course, but fell hard and woke up in a toboggan. Two years earlier, Miller had competed in two events at the 1954 World Championships in Åre, Sweden.

Born and raised in Hanover, New Hampshire, he raced for hometown Dartmouth College and won the NCAA overall skimeister title in 1951 and in 1957.

He first went to Chile four years earlier, one of the first American ski racers to off-season train in South America. The speed record stood for fifteen years. 

Miller served in the U.S. Army's Mountain Training Command in the mid-1950s, graduated from Harvard Medical School in 1961 and later taught at the University of Kentucky College of Medicine in Lexington. His wife, Pam Miller, was the mayor of Lexington for ten years.

World Championship results 

From 1948 through 1980, the Winter Olympics were also the World Championships for alpine skiing.
At the World Championships from 1954 through 1980, the combined was a "paper race" using the results of the three events (DH, GS, SL).

References

External links
 

1933 births
2021 deaths
American male alpine skiers
Olympic alpine skiers of the United States
Alpine skiers at the 1956 Winter Olympics
People from Hanover, New Hampshire
Dartmouth Big Green skiers
Harvard Medical School alumni
University of Kentucky faculty